"New Orleans" is a song written by Frank Guida and Joseph Royster and performed by Gary U.S. Bonds. It was featured on his 1961 album Dance 'Til Quarter to Three with U.S. Bonds. Frank Guida also produced the track. Backing was provided by Gene Barge's group The Church Street Five.

Chart performance
"New Orleans" reached #5 on the U.S. R&B chart, #6 on the U.S. pop chart, and #16 on the UK Singles Chart in 1960.

Other charting versions
Bern Elliott and the Fenmen - a single, in 1964, which reached #24 on the UK Singles Chart.
Eddie Hodges - a single, in 1965, which reached #44 on the U.S. pop chart.
The Chartbusters - a single, in 1965, which reached #134 on the U.S. pop chart.
Steve Alaimo - a single, in 1967, which reached #126 on the U.S. pop chart.
Neil Diamond - a single, in 1968, which reached #51 on the U.S. pop chart.
Anthony Armstrong Jones, as the B-side to his 1969 single "And Say Goodbye".  It reached #28 on the U.S. country chart.
Harley Quinne, in 1972, reaching #19 in the UK Charts
King Biscuit Boy - a single, in 1975, which reached #68 in Canada.
Gillan - a single, in 1981, which reached #17 on the UK Singles Chart.

Other versions
Dave Myers and The Surftones , on their 1963 album The Winners of the 18 Band Surf Battle!
The Ventures, on their 1963 album Let's Go!
The Strangeloves, on their 1965 album I Want Candy.
Dick and Dee Dee, on their 1966 album Songs We've Sung on Shindig.
Paul Revere & the Raiders, on their 1966 album Just Like Us!
The Kingsmen, on their 1964 album The Kingsmen Volume II and on their 1966 album 15 Great Hits.
Travis Wammack, as a single in 1973, but it did not chart.
Dr. John, on his 1975 album Dr. John and His New Orleans Congregation.
Neil Sedaka, featuring Bonds, on his 1984 album Come See About Me.
Joan Jett and The Blackhearts, on their 1984 album Glorious Results of a Misspent Youth.
Robbie Coltrane, as a single in 1988 in the UK, but it did not chart.
Teresa Brewer, on her 1991 compilation album 16 Most Requested Songs.
Ray Stevens, on his 2007 album New Orleans Moon.
 The Grateful Dead performed the song live 3 times in 1970, and once in 1984 along with members of The Band.
 The song was performed in the 1998 movie the Blues Brothers 2000 by the Blues Brothers Band and "The Louisiana Gator Boys". It was also included in the movie's soundtrack album.

References

1960 songs
1960 debut singles
1964 singles
1965 singles
1967 singles
1968 singles
1973 singles
1975 singles
1981 singles
1988 singles
Songs written by Frank Guida
Gary U.S. Bonds songs
Neil Diamond songs
The Ventures songs
Dick and Dee Dee songs
Paul Revere & the Raiders songs
Anthony Armstrong Jones songs
Dr. John songs
Neil Sedaka songs
Joan Jett songs
Teresa Brewer songs
Ray Stevens songs
Song recordings produced by Richard Gottehrer
Song recordings produced by Terry Melcher
Song recordings produced by Dan Hartman
Bang Records singles
Atco Records singles
Epic Records singles
The Blues Brothers songs